Ceber may refer to the following places in Poland:
Ceber, Lower Silesian Voivodeship (south-west Poland)
Ceber, Świętokrzyskie Voivodeship (south-central Poland)